This is a list of UConn Huskies softball seasons. The UConn Huskies softball program is a college softball team that represents the University of Connecticut in the Big East Conference of the National Collegiate Athletic Association.

The Huskies have won six conference regular season championships, eight conference tournaments, and have appeared in the NCAA Division I softball tournament eight times, advancing to the Women's College World Series in 1993.

Season results

Notes

References

UConn Huskies softball seasons
UConn
UConn Huskies softball seasons